Dianne Burge (née Bowering), (born 9 October 1943) is a former Australian sprinter who competed in two Olympic Games and won three gold medals at the Commonwealth Games.  She was awarded the title South Australian 'Athlete of the Century' by Athletics South Australia.

Early athletics career
In 1963, Adelaide sprinter Diane Bowering won the Australian 100-yard Championships in an upset.  She was virtually unknown outside her home state but ended the year ranked as #3 in the world.  She competed for Adelaide Harriers and was coached by Len Barnes who nicknamed her 'the twerp'

International athletics career
A year later, Bowering ran second in the national 100y title and earned a place in the Australian team for the 1964 Summer Olympic Games in Tokyo.  At the Games, she did not progress past the second round of the 100 metres, but made the final of the 4 × 100 metres relay with the Australian team.

Now married and running as Dianne Burge, she starred in the 1966 British Empire and Commonwealth Games in Kingston, Jamaica, winning gold medals at 100 yards, 220 yards and in the 4x110 yards relay.  At the end of the year, she was world-ranked #6 for 100 metres and #5 for 200 metres.

In 1967, she won the 100 m and 200 m at the United States versus British Commonwealth meet in Los Angeles, beating Olympic champion Wyomia Tyus and was ranked #2 in the world for 100 m and #3 for 200 m by Track and Field News.

Burge won the sprint double at the 1968 Australian Championships, running fast times of 11.3 and 23.0 with the 100 metres time a new Australian record. Considered a medal favourite at the Mexico Olympics, she was affected by illness in Mexico City and did well to make the 100-metres final, placing sixth.

She was ranked sixth in the world for 100 metres, when she retired from the sport in early 1969.

Awards

Burge was awarded the inaugural Sportswomen's Association of Australia (SA Division) 'Sportswoman of the Year' award in 1966.

She was named as the 'Athlete of the Century' by Athletics South Australia.

Statistics

Personal Bests

World Rankings - 100 m and 200 m

Australian Championships Record

 DNQ=Did not qualify for final (only six athletes per final in this era)

References

1943 births
Living people
Australian female sprinters
Athletes (track and field) at the 1968 Summer Olympics
Olympic athletes of Australia
Commonwealth Games gold medallists for Australia
Athletes (track and field) at the 1964 Summer Olympics
Athletes (track and field) at the 1966 British Empire and Commonwealth Games
Commonwealth Games medallists in athletics
Olympic female sprinters
Medallists at the 1966 British Empire and Commonwealth Games